Eva-1 homolog A (C. elegans) is a protein that in humans is encoded by the EVA1A gene.

References

Further reading 

 
 
 

Human proteins